The 2000 Wolverhampton Metropolitan Borough Council election for the City of Wolverhampton Council were held on 4 May 2000.

The Labour Party retained control of the council, although Labour polled a lower percentage of votes (40.21%) than the Conservative Party (44.61%) in this election.

The composition of the council prior to the election was:

Labour 40
Conservative 17
Liberal Democrat 3

The composition of the council following the election was:

Labour 33
Conservative 24
Liberal Democrat 3

Election results

External links
Wolverhampton election results 2000 from BBC
Local Election Results for May 2000

2000
2000 English local elections
2000s in the West Midlands (county)